Leo Shuken (born December 8, 1906, Los Angeles, California - d. July 24, 1976, Santa Monica, California) was an American film music composer, arranger, and musical director.

Shuken composed for the music industry from the end of the 1930s until shortly before his death, contributing music to over 100 films (many of which were uncredited). His first, uncredited, score was for Go West, Young Man in 1937. He won an Academy Award for his work on the 1939 film Stagecoach, and was nominated in 1964 for the Academy Award for Best Original Score for The Unsinkable Molly Brown. He is interred at Forest Lawn Memorial Park in Glendale, California.

Further reading
 Jürgen Wölfer & Roland Löper: "Das grosse Lexikon der Filmkomponisten. Die Magier der cineastischen Akustik - von Ennio Morricone bis Hans Zimmer". Schwarzkopf&Schwarzkopf, Berlin 2003, .

References

External links
Biography

1906 births
1976 deaths
Musicians from Los Angeles
American film score composers
American male film score composers
Best Original Music Score Academy Award winners
20th-century classical musicians
20th-century American composers
20th-century American male musicians